The 39th Robert Awards ceremony, presented by Danish Film Academy, took place on 5 February 2022 at the Tivoli Hotel & Congress Centre in Copenhagen, Denmark to honour the best in Danish film and television of 2021.

Winners and nominees
The nominations were announced on 4 January 2022. Winners are listed first, highlighted in boldface, and indicated with a double dagger.

Film

Films with multiple nominations and awards

Television

Shows with multiple nominations and awards

References

External links
  

2021 film awards
2022 in Copenhagen
Robert Awards ceremonies